The Truck (translit. Kamionat) is a 1980 Bulgarian drama film directed by Christo Christov. It was entered into the 31st Berlin International Film Festival.

Cast
 Grigor Vachkov as Dedleto
 Lilyana Kovacheva as Milena
 Veselin Vulkov as Shteryo
 Stefan Dimitrov as Doktorat
 Djoko Rosic as Chitanugata
 Zhivka Peneva
 Emil Markov
 Yordan Spirov
 Nikolay Nachkov
 Hristo Krachmarov
 Iwan Tomow
 Minka Syulemezova

References

External links

1980 films
1980s Bulgarian-language films
1980 drama films
Films directed by Christo Christov
Bulgarian drama films